California is a state in the Western United States, located along the Pacific Coast. It is also the most populated subnational entity in North America and the 34th most populous in the world. The Greater Los Angeles and San Francisco Bay areas are the nation's second and fifth most populous urban regions respectively, with the former having more than 18.7million residents and the latter having over 9.6million. Sacramento is the state's capital, while Los Angeles is the most populous city in the state and the second most populous city in the country. San Francisco is the second most densely populated major city in the country. Los Angeles County is the country's most populous, while San Bernardino County is the largest county by area in the country. California borders Oregon to the north, Nevada and Arizona to the east, the Mexican state of Baja California to the south; and it has a coastline along the Pacific Ocean to the west.

The economy of the state of California is the largest in the United States, with a $3.37 trillion gross state product (GSP) . It is the largest sub-national economy in the world. If California were a sovereign nation, it would rank as the world's fifth-largest economy , behind Germany and ahead of India, as well as the 37th most populous. The Greater Los Angeles area and the San Francisco area are the nation's second- and fourth-largest urban economies ($1.0trillion and $0.6trillion respectively ), following the New York metropolitan area's $1.8trillion. The San Francisco Bay Area Combined Statistical Area had the nation's highest gross domestic product per capita ($106,757) among large primary statistical areas in 2018, and is home to five of the world's ten largest companies by market capitalization and four of the world's ten richest people. Slightly over 84 percent of the state's residents hold a high school degree, the lowest high school education rate of all 50 states.

Prior to European colonization, California was one of the most culturally and linguistically diverse areas in pre-Columbian North America and contained the highest Native American population density north of what is now Mexico. European exploration in the 16th and 17th centuries led to the colonization of California by the Spanish Empire. In 1804, it was included in Alta California province within the Viceroyalty of New Spain. The area became a part of Mexico in 1821, following its successful war for independence, but was ceded to the United States in 1848 after the Mexican–American War. The California Gold Rush started in 1848 and led to dramatic social and demographic changes, including large-scale immigration into California, a worldwide economic boom, and the California genocide of indigenous peoples. The western portion of Alta California was then organized and admitted as the 31st state on September 9, 1850, following the Compromise of 1850.

Notable contributions to popular culture, for example in entertainment, sports, music, and fashion, have their origins in California. The state also has made noteworthy contributions in the fields of communication, information, innovation, education, environmentalism, entertainment, economics, politics, technology, and religion. It is the home of Hollywood, the oldest and one of the largest film industries in the world, which has had a profound influence upon global entertainment. It is considered the origin of the American film industry, hippie counterculture, beach and car culture, the personal computer, the internet, fast food, diners, burger joints, skateboarding, and the fortune cookie among other innovations. Many full-service restaurants, such as IHOP, Denny’s, and Cheesecake Factory, were also invented in the state. The state is also notable for being home to many amusement parks, such as Disneyland, Six Flags Magic Mountain, Knotts Berry Farm, Universal Studios Hollywood, SeaWorld San Diego, and others. The San Francisco Bay Area and the Greater Los Angeles Area are widely seen as the centers of the global technology and film industries, respectively. California's economy is very diverse: 58% of it is based on finance, government, real estate, technology, professional, scientific, technical and business services, architecture, academia, accountancy, marketing, law, market research, business and executive management, economics, consulting, customer support, human resources, information technology, engineering, research and development, design, public relations, education, healthcare, transportation, trade, hospitality, leisure, utilities, tourism, manufacturing, construction, roofing, shipping, warehousing, food processing, trucking, mining, oil field work, recycling, maintenance, custodial work, logging, landscaping, waste collection and disposal, and many other industries. Although agriculture (including hunting, farming, and fishing) accounts for only 1.5% of the state's economy, California's agriculture industry has the highest output of any U.S. state. California's ports and harbors handle about a third of all U.S. imports, most originating in Pacific Rim international trade.

The state's extremely diverse geography ranges from the Pacific Coast and metropolitan areas in the west to the Sierra Nevada mountains in the east, and from the redwood and Douglas fir forests in the northwest to the Mojave Desert in the southeast. Two-thirds of the nation"s earthquake risk lies in California. The Central Valley, a fertile agricultural area, dominates the state's center. California is well known for its warm Mediterranean climate along the coast and monsoon seasonal weather inland. The large size of the state results in climates that vary from moist temperate rainforest in the north to arid desert in the interior, as well as snowy alpine in the mountains. Drought and wildfires are a persistent issue for the state. California has established a state program in recognition of Native American use of fire in ecosystems to mitigate wildfires.

Etymology

The Spaniards gave the name  to the peninsula of Baja California and to Alta California, the latter region becoming the present-day state of California.

The name derived from the mythical island of California in the fictional story of Queen Calafia, as recorded in a 1510 work The Adventures of Esplandián by Castilian author Garci Rodríguez de Montalvo. Queen Calafia's kingdom was said to be a remote land rich in gold and pearls, inhabited by beautiful Black women who wore gold armor and lived like Amazons, as well as griffins and other strange beasts. In the fictional paradise, the ruler Queen Calafia fought alongside Muslims and her name may have been chosen to echo the Muslim title caliph, used for Muslim leaders.

Official abbreviations of the state's name include CA, Cal., Calif., and US-CA.

History

Indigenous

California was one of the most culturally and linguistically diverse areas in pre-Columbian North America. Historians generally agree that there were at least 300,000 people living in California prior to European colonization. The Indigenous peoples of California included more than 70 distinct ethnic groups, inhabiting environments ranging from mountains and deserts to islands and redwood forests.

Living in these diverse geographic areas, the Indigenous peoples developed complex forms of ecosystem management, including forest gardening to ensure the regular availability of food and medicinal plants. This was a form of sustainable agriculture. To mitigate destructive large wildfires from ravaging the natural environment, Indigenous peoples developed a practice of controlled burning. This practice was recognized for its benefits by the California government in 2022.

These groups were also diverse in their political organization, with bands, tribes, villages, and, on the resource-rich coasts, large chiefdoms, such as the Chumash, Pomo and Salinan. Trade, intermarriage, craft specialists, and military alliances fostered social and economic relationships between many groups. Although nations would sometimes war, most armed conflicts were between groups of men for vengeance. Acquiring territory was not usually the purpose of these small-scale battles.

Men and women generally had different roles in society. Women were often responsible for weaving, harvesting, processing, and preparing food, while men for hunting and other forms of physical labor. Most societies also had roles for people who the Spanish referred to as joyas, who they saw as "men who dressed as women." Joyas were responsible for death, burial, and mourning rituals and performed women's social roles. Indigenous societies had their own terms to refer to them. The Chumash referred to them as 'aqi. The early Spanish settlers detested and sought to eliminate them.

Spanish period

The first Europeans to explore the coast of California were the members of a Spanish maritime expedition led by Portuguese captain Juan Rodríguez Cabrillo in 1542. Cabrillo was commissioned by Antonio de Mendoza, the Viceroy of New Spain, to lead an expedition up the Pacific coast in search of trade opportunities; they entered San Diego Bay on September 28, 1542, and reached at least as far north as San Miguel Island. Privateer and explorer Francis Drake explored and claimed an undefined portion of the California coast in 1579, landing north of the future city of San Francisco. Sebastián Vizcaíno explored and mapped the coast of California in 1602 for New Spain, putting ashore in Monterey. Despite the on-the-ground explorations of California in the 16th century, Rodríguez's idea of California as an island persisted. Such depictions appeared on many European maps well into the 18th century.

The Portolá expedition of 1769-70 was a pivotal event in the Spanish colonization of California, resulting in the establishment of numerous missions, presidios, and pueblos. The military and civil contingent of the expedition was led by Gaspar de Portolá, who traveled over land from Sonora into California, while the religious component was headed by Junípero Serra, who came by sea from Baja California. In 1769, Portolá and Serra established Mission San Diego de Alcalá and the Presidio of San Diego, the first religious and military settlements founded by the Spanish in California. By the end of the expedition in 1770, they would establish the Presidio of Monterey and Mission San Carlos Borromeo de Carmelo on Monterey Bay. 

After the Portolà expedition, Spanish missionaries led by Father-President Serra set out to establish 21 Spanish missions of California along El Camino Real ("The Royal Road") and along the Californian coast, 16 sites of which having been chosen during the Portolá expedition. Numerous major cities in California grew out of missions, including San Francisco (Mission San Francisco de Asís), San Diego (Mission San Diego de Alcalá), Ventura (Mission San Buenaventura), or Santa Barbara (Mission Santa Barbara), among others.

Juan Bautista de Anza led a similarly important expedition throughout California in 1775–76, which would extend deeper into the interior and north of California. The Anza expedition selected numerous sites for missions, presidios, and pueblos, which subsequently would be established by settlers. Gabriel Moraga, a member of the expedition, would also christen many of California's prominent rivers with their names in 1775–1776, such as the Sacramento River and the San Joaquin River. After the expedition, Gabriel's son, José Joaquín Moraga, would found the pueblo of San Jose in 1777, making it the first civilian-established city in California.

During this same period, sailors from the Russian Empire explored along the northern coast of California. In 1812, the Russian-American Company established a trading post and small fortification at Fort Ross on the North Coast. Fort Ross was primarily used to supply Russia's Alaskan colonies with food supplies. The settlement did not meet much success, failing to attract settlers or establish long term trade viability, and was abandoned by 1841.

During the War of Mexican Independence, Alta California was largely unaffected and uninvolved in the revolution, though many Californios supported independence from Spain, which many believed had neglected California and limited its development. Spain's trade monopoly on California had limited the trade prospects of Californians. Following Mexican independence, Californian ports were freely able to trade with foreign merchants. Governor Pablo Vicente de Solá presided over the transition from Spanish colonial rule to independent Mexican rule.

Mexican period

In 1821, the Mexican War of Independence gave the Mexican Empire (which included California) independence from Spain. For the next 25 years, Alta California remained a remote, sparsely populated, northwestern administrative district of the newly independent country of Mexico, which shortly after independence became a republic.
The missions, which controlled most of the best land in the state, were secularized by 1834 and became the property of the Mexican government. The governor granted many square leagues of land to others with political influence. These huge ranchos or cattle ranches emerged as the dominant institutions of Mexican California. The ranchos developed under ownership by Californios (Hispanics native of California) who traded cowhides and tallow with Boston merchants. Beef did not become a commodity until the 1849 California Gold Rush.

From the 1820s, trappers and settlers from the United States and Canada began to arrive in Northern California. These new arrivals used the Siskiyou Trail, California Trail, Oregon Trail and Old Spanish Trail to cross the rugged mountains and harsh deserts in and surrounding California.
The early government of the newly independent Mexico was highly unstable, and in a reflection of this, from 1831 onwards, California also experienced a series of armed disputes, both internal and with the central Mexican government. During this tumultuous political period Juan Bautista Alvarado was able to secure the governorship during 1836–1842. The military action which first brought Alvarado to power had momentarily declared California to be an independent state, and had been aided by Anglo-American residents of California, including Isaac Graham. In 1840, one hundred of those residents who did not have passports were arrested, leading to the Graham Affair, which was resolved in part with the intercession of Royal Navy officials.

One of the largest ranchers in California was John Marsh. After failing to obtain justice against squatters on his land from the Mexican courts, he determined that California should become part of the United States. Marsh conducted a letter-writing campaign espousing the California climate, the soil, and other reasons to settle there, as well as the best route to follow, which became known as "Marsh's route". His letters were read, reread, passed around, and printed in newspapers throughout the country, and started the first wagon trains rolling to California. He invited immigrants to stay on his ranch until they could get settled, and assisted in their obtaining passports.

After ushering in the period of organized emigration to California, Marsh became involved in a military battle between the much-hated Mexican general, Manuel Micheltorena and the California governor he had replaced, Juan Bautista Alvarado. The armies of each met at the Battle of Providencia near Los Angeles. Marsh had been forced against his will to join Micheltorena's army. Ignoring his superiors, during the battle, he signaled the other side for a parley. There were many settlers from the United States fighting on both sides. He convinced each side that they had no reason to be fighting each other. As a result of Marsh's actions, they abandoned the fight, Micheltorena was defeated, and California-born Pio Pico was returned to the governorship. This paved the way to California's ultimate acquisition by the United States.

U.S. Conquest and the California Republic

In 1846, a group of American settlers in and around Sonoma rebelled against Mexican rule during the Bear Flag Revolt. Afterward, rebels raised the Bear Flag (featuring a bear, a star, a red stripe and the words "California Republic") at Sonoma. The Republic's only president was William B. Ide, who played a pivotal role during the Bear Flag Revolt. This revolt by American settlers served as a prelude to the later American military invasion of California and was closely coordinated with nearby American military commanders.

The California Republic was short-lived; the same year marked the outbreak of the Mexican–American War (1846–48).

Commodore John D. Sloat of the United States Navy sailed into Monterey Bay in 1846 and began the U.S. military invasion of California, with Northern California capitulating in less than a month to the United States forces. In Southern California, Californios continued to resist American forces. Notable military engagements of the conquest include the Battle of San Pasqual and the Battle of Dominguez Rancho in Southern California, as well as the Battle of Olómpali and the Battle of Santa Clara in Northern California. After a series of defensive battles in the south, the Treaty of Cahuenga was signed by the Californios on January 13, 1847, securing a censure and establishing de facto American control in California.

Early American period

Following the Treaty of Guadalupe Hidalgo (February 2, 1848) that ended the war, the westernmost portion of the annexed Mexican territory of Alta California soon became the American state of California, and the remainder of the old territory was then subdivided into the new American Territories of Arizona, Nevada, Colorado and Utah. The even more lightly populated and arid lower region of old Baja California remained as a part of Mexico. In 1846, the total settler population of the western part of the old Alta California had been estimated to be no more than 8,000, plus about 100,000 Native Americans, down from about 300,000 before Hispanic settlement in 1769.

In 1848, only one week before the official American annexation of the area, gold was discovered in California, this being an event which was to forever alter both the state's demographics and its finances. Soon afterward, a massive influx of immigration into the area resulted, as prospectors and miners arrived by the thousands. The population burgeoned with United States citizens, Europeans, Middle Easterns, Chinese and other immigrants during the great California Gold Rush. By the time of California's application for statehood in 1850, the settler population of California had multiplied to 100,000. By 1854, more than 300,000 settlers had come. Between 1847 and 1870, the population of San Francisco increased from 500 to 150,000. 

The seat of government for California under Spanish and later Mexican rule had been located in Monterey from 1777 until 1845. Pio Pico, the last Mexican governor of Alta California, had briefly moved the capital to Los Angeles in 1845. The United States consulate had also been located in Monterey, under consul Thomas O. Larkin.

In 1849, a state Constitutional Convention was first held in Monterey. Among the first tasks of the convention was a decision on a location for the new state capital. The first full legislative sessions were held in San Jose (1850–1851). Subsequent locations included Vallejo (1852–1853), and nearby Benicia (1853–1854); these locations eventually proved to be inadequate as well. The capital has been located in Sacramento since 1854 with only a short break in 1862 when legislative sessions were held in San Francisco due to flooding in Sacramento.
Once the state's Constitutional Convention had finalized its state constitution, it applied to the U.S. Congress for admission to statehood. On September 9, 1850, as part of the Compromise of 1850, California became a free state and September9 a state holiday.

During the American Civil War (1861–1865), California sent gold shipments eastward to Washington in support of the Union. However, due to the existence of a large contingent of pro-South sympathizers within the state, the state was not able to muster any full military regiments to send eastwards to officially serve in the Union war effort. Still, several smaller military units within the Union army were unofficially associated with the state of California, such as the "California 100 Company", due to a majority of their members being from California.

At the time of California's admission into the Union, travel between California and the rest of the continental United States had been a time-consuming and dangerous feat. Nineteen years later, and seven years after it was greenlighted by President Lincoln, the First transcontinental railroad was completed in 1869. California was then reachable from the eastern States in a week's time.

Much of the state was extremely well suited to fruit cultivation and agriculture in general. Vast expanses of wheat, other cereal crops, vegetable crops, cotton, and nut and fruit trees were grown (including oranges in Southern California), and the foundation was laid for the state's prodigious agricultural production in the Central Valley and elsewhere.

In the nineteenth century, a large number of migrants from China traveled to the state as part of the Gold Rush or to seek work. Even though the Chinese proved indispensable in building the transcontinental railroad from California to Utah, perceived job competition with the Chinese led to anti-Chinese riots in the state, and eventually the US ended migration from China partially as a response to pressure from California with the 1882 Chinese Exclusion Act.

California Genocide

Under earlier Spanish and Mexican rule, California's original native population had precipitously declined, above all, from Eurasian diseases to which the Indigenous people of California had not yet developed a natural immunity. Under its new American administration, California's first governor Peter Hardeman Burnett instituted policies that have been described as a state-sanctioned policy of elimination toward California's Indigenous people. Burnett announced in 1851 in his Second Annual Message to the Legislature: "That a war of extermination will continue to be waged between the races until the Indian race becomes extinct must be expected. While we cannot anticipate the result with but painful regret, the inevitable destiny of the race is beyond the power and wisdom of man to avert."

As in other American states, Indigenous peoples were forcibly removed from their lands by American settlers, like miners, ranchers, and farmers. Although California had entered the American union as a free state, the "loitering or orphaned Indians," were de facto enslaved by their new Anglo-American masters under the 1850 Act for the Government and Protection of Indians. One of these de facto slave auctions was approved by the Los Angeles City Council and occurred for nearly twenty years. There were many massacres in which hundreds of Indigenous people were killed by settlers for their land.

Between 1850 and 1860, the California state government paid around 1.5million dollars (some 250,000 of which was reimbursed by the federal government) to hire militias with the stated purpose of protecting settlers, however these militias perpetrated numerous massacres of Indigenous people. Indigenous people were also forcibly moved to reservations and rancherias, which were often small and isolated and without enough natural resources or funding from the government to adequately sustain the populations living on them. As a result, settler colonialism was a calamity for Indigenous people. Several scholars and Native American activists, including Benjamin Madley and Ed Castillo, have described the actions of the California government as a genocide, as well as the 40th governor of California Gavin Newsom. Benjamin Madley estimates that from 1846 to 1873, between 9,492 and 16,092 Indigenous people were killed, including between 1,680 and 3,741 killed by the U.S. Army.

1900–present

In the twentieth century, thousands of Japanese people migrated to the US and California specifically to attempt to purchase and own land in the state. However, the state in 1913 passed the Alien Land Act, excluding Asian immigrants from owning land. During World War II, Japanese Americans in California were interned in concentration camps such as at Tule Lake and Manzanar. In 2020, California officially apologized for this internment.

Migration to California accelerated during the early 20th century with the completion of major transcontinental highways like the Lincoln Highway and Route 66. In the period from 1900 to 1965, the population grew from fewer than one million to the greatest in the Union. In 1940, the Census Bureau reported California's population as 6.0% Hispanic, 2.4% Asian, and 89.5% non-Hispanic white.

To meet the population's needs, major engineering feats like the California and Los Angeles Aqueducts; the Oroville and Shasta Dams; and the Bay and Golden Gate Bridges were built across the state. The state government also adopted the California Master Plan for Higher Education in 1960 to develop a highly efficient system of public education.

Meanwhile, attracted to the mild Mediterranean climate, cheap land, and the state's wide variety of geography, filmmakers established the studio system in Hollywood in the 1920s. California manufactured 8.7 percent of total United States military armaments produced during World War II, ranking third (behind New York and Michigan) among the 48 states. California however easily ranked first in production of military ships during the war (transport, cargo, [merchant ships] such as Liberty ships, Victory ships, and warships) at drydock facilities in San Diego, Los Angeles, and the San Francisco Bay Area. After World War II, California's economy greatly expanded due to strong aerospace and defense industries, whose size decreased following the end of the Cold War. Stanford University and its Dean of Engineering Frederick Terman began encouraging faculty and graduates to stay in California instead of leaving the state, and develop a high-tech region in the area now known as Silicon Valley. As a result of these efforts, California is regarded as a world center of the entertainment and music industries, of technology, engineering, and the aerospace industry, and as the United States center of agricultural production. Just before the Dot Com Bust, California had the fifth-largest economy in the world among nations.

In the mid and late twentieth century, a number of race-related incidents occurred in the state. Tensions between police and African Americans, combined with unemployment and poverty in inner cities, led to violent riots, such as the 1965 Watts riots and 1992 Rodney King riots. California was also the hub of the Black Panther Party, a group known for arming African Americans to defend against racial injustice  and for organizing free breakfast programs for schoolchildren. Additionally, Mexican, Filipino, and other migrant farm workers rallied in the state around Cesar Chavez for better pay in the 1960s and 1970s.

During the 20th century, two great disasters happened in California. The 1906 San Francisco earthquake and 1928 St. Francis Dam flood remain the deadliest in U.S. history.

Although air pollution problems have been reduced, health problems associated with pollution have continued. The brown haze known as "smog" has been substantially abated after the passage of federal and state restrictions on automobile exhaust.

An energy crisis in 2001 led to rolling blackouts, soaring power rates, and the importation of electricity from neighboring states. Southern California Edison and Pacific Gas and Electric Company came under heavy criticism.

Housing prices in urban areas continued to increase; a modest home which in the 1960s cost $25,000 would cost half a million dollars or more in urban areas by 2005. More people commuted longer hours to afford a home in more rural areas while earning larger salaries in the urban areas. Speculators bought houses they never intended to live in, expecting to make a huge profit in a matter of months, then rolling it over by buying more properties. Mortgage companies were compliant, as everyone assumed the prices would keep rising. The bubble burst in 2007–8 as housing prices began to crash and the boom years ended. Hundreds of billions in property values vanished and foreclosures soared as many financial institutions and investors were badly hurt.

In the twenty-first century, droughts and frequent wildfires attributed to climate change have occurred in the state. From 2011 to 2017, a persistent drought was the worst in its recorded history. The 2018 wildfire season was the state's deadliest and most destructive, most notably Camp Fire.

Although air pollution problems have been reduced, health problems associated with pollution have continued. The brown haze that is known as "smog" has been substantially abated thanks to federal and state restrictions on automobile exhaust.

One of the first confirmed COVID-19 cases in the United States that occurred in California was first of which was confirmed on January 26, 2020. Meaning, all of the early confirmed cases were persons who had recently travelled to China in Asia, as testing was restricted to this group. On this January 29, 2020, as disease containment protocols were still being developed, the U.S. Department of State evacuated 195 persons from Wuhan, China aboard a chartered flight to March Air Reserve Base in Riverside County, and in this process, it may have granted and conferred to escalated within the land and the US at cosmic. On February 5, 2020, the U.S. evacuated 345 more citizens from Hubei Province to two military bases in California, Travis Air Force Base in Solano County and Marine Corps Air Station Miramar, San Diego, where they were quarantined for 14 days. A state of emergency was largely declared in this state of the nation on March 4, 2020, and as of February 24, 2021, remains in effect. A mandatory statewide stay-at-home order was issued on March 19, 2020, due to increase, which was ended on January 25, 2021, allowing citizens to return to normal life. On April 6, 2021, the state announced plans to fully reopen the economy by June 15, 2021.

In 2019, the 40th governor of California, Gavin Newsom formally apologized to the Indigenous peoples of California for the California genocide: "Genocide. No other way to describe it, and that’s the way it needs to be described in the history books." Newsom further acknowledged that "the actions of the state 150 years ago have ongoing ramifications even today." Cultural and language revitalization efforts among Indigenous Californians have progressed among several tribes as of 2022. Some land returns to Indigenous stewardship have occurred throughout California. In 2022, the largest dam removal and river restoration project in US history was announced for the Klamath River as a win for California tribes.

Geography

California is one of the most geographically diverse states in the union and is often geographically bisected into two regions, Southern California, comprising the ten southernmost counties, and Northern California, comprising the 48 northernmost counties. It is bordered by Oregon to the north, Nevada to the east and northeast, Arizona to the southeast, the Pacific Ocean to the west and shares an international border with the Mexican state of Baja California to the south (with which it makes up part of The Californias region of North America, alongside Baja California Sur).

In the middle of the state lies the California Central Valley, bounded by the Sierra Nevada in the east, the coastal mountain ranges in the west, the Cascade Range to the north and by the Tehachapi Mountains in the south. The Central Valley is California's productive agricultural heartland.

Divided in two by the Sacramento-San Joaquin River Delta, the northern portion, the Sacramento Valley serves as the watershed of the Sacramento River, while the southern portion, the San Joaquin Valley is the watershed for the San Joaquin River. Both valleys derive their names from the rivers that flow through them. With dredging, the Sacramento and the San Joaquin Rivers have remained deep enough for several inland cities to be seaports.

The Sacramento-San Joaquin River Delta is a critical water supply hub for the state. Water is diverted from the delta and through an extensive network of pumps and canals that traverse nearly the length of the state, to the Central Valley and the State Water Projects and other needs. Water from the Delta provides drinking water for nearly 23million people, almost two-thirds of the state's population as well as water for farmers on the west side of the San Joaquin Valley.

Suisun Bay lies at the confluence of the Sacramento and San Joaquin Rivers. The water is drained by the Carquinez Strait, which flows into San Pablo Bay, a northern extension of San Francisco Bay, which then connects to the Pacific Ocean via the Golden Gate strait.

The Channel Islands are located off the Southern coast, while the Farallon Islands lie west of San Francisco.

The range embraces Yosemite Valley, famous for its glacially carved domes, and Sequoia National Park, home to the giant sequoia trees, the largest living organisms on Earth, and the deep freshwater lake, Lake Tahoe, the largest lake in the state by volume.

To the east of the Sierra Nevada are Owens Valley and Mono Lake, an essential migratory bird habitat. In the western part of the state is Clear Lake, the largest freshwater lake by area entirely in California. Although Lake Tahoe is larger, it is divided by the California/Nevada border. The Sierra Nevada falls to Arctic temperatures in winter and has several dozen small glaciers, including Palisade Glacier, the southernmost glacier in the United States.

The Tulare Lake was the largest freshwater lake west of the Mississippi River. A remnant of Pleistocene-era Lake Corcoran, Tulare Lake dried up by the early 20th century after its tributary rivers were diverted for agricultural irrigation and municipal water uses.

About 45 percent of the state's total surface area is covered by forests, and California's diversity of pine species is unmatched by any other state. California contains more forestland than any other state except Alaska. Many of the trees in the California White Mountains are the oldest in the world; an individual bristlecone pine is over 5,000 years old.

In the south is a large inland salt lake, the Salton Sea. Indeed, almost all of southeastern California is arid, hot desert, with routine extreme high temperatures during the summer. The southeastern border of California with Arizona is entirely formed by the Colorado River, from which the southern part of the state gets about half of its water.

A majority of California's cities are located in either the San Francisco Bay Area or the Sacramento metropolitan area in Northern California; or the Los Angeles area, the Inland Empire, or the San Diego metropolitan area in Southern California. The Los Angeles Area, the Bay Area, and the San Diego metropolitan area are among several major metropolitan areas along the California coast.

As part of the Ring of Fire, California is subject to tsunamis, floods, droughts, Santa Ana winds, wildfires, landslides on steep terrain, and has several volcanoes. It has many earthquakes due to several faults running through the state, the largest being the San Andreas Fault. About 37,000 earthquakes are recorded each year; most are too small to be felt, but two-thirds of the human risk from earthquakes lies in California.

Climate

Although most of the state has a Mediterranean climate, due to the state's large size the climate ranges from polar to subtropical. The cool California Current offshore often creates summer fog near the coast. Farther inland, there are colder winters and hotter summers. The maritime moderation results in the shoreline summertime temperatures of Los Angeles and San Francisco being the coolest of all major metropolitan areas of the United States and uniquely cool compared to areas on the same latitude in the interior and on the east coast of the North American continent. Even the San Diego shoreline bordering Mexico is cooler in summer than most areas in the contiguous United States. Just a few miles inland, summer temperature extremes are significantly higher, with downtown Los Angeles being several degrees warmer than at the coast. The same microclimate phenomenon is seen in the climate of the Bay Area, where areas sheltered from the ocean experience significantly hotter summers and colder winters in contrast with nearby areas closer to the ocean.

Northern parts of the state have more rain than the south. California's mountain ranges also influence the climate: some of the rainiest parts of the state are west-facing mountain slopes. Coastal northwestern California has a temperate climate, and the Central Valley has a Mediterranean climate but with greater temperature extremes than the coast. The high mountains, including the Sierra Nevada, have an alpine climate with snow in winter and mild to moderate heat in summer.

California's mountains produce rain shadows on the eastern side, creating extensive deserts. The higher elevation deserts of eastern California have hot summers and cold winters, while the low deserts east of the Southern California mountains have hot summers and nearly frostless mild winters. Death Valley, a desert with large expanses below sea level, is considered the hottest location in the world; the highest temperature in the world, was recorded there on July 10, 1913.

The table below lists average temperatures for January and August in a selection of places throughout the state; some highly populated and some not. This includes the relatively cool summers of the Humboldt Bay region around Eureka, the extreme heat of Death Valley, and the mountain climate of Mammoth in the Sierra Nevada.

The wide range of climates leads to a high demand for water. Over time, droughts and wildfires have been increasing due to climate change and overextraction, becoming less seasonal and more year-round, further straining California's electricity supply and water security and having an impact on California business, industry, and agriculture.

In 2022, a new state program was created in collaboration with Indigenous peoples of California to revive the practice of controlled burns as a way of clearing excessive forest debris and making landscapes more resilient to wildfires. Native American use of fire in ecosystem management was outlawed in 1911, yet has now been recognized.

Ecology

California is one of the ecologically richest and most diverse parts of the world, and includes some of the most endangered ecological communities. California is part of the Nearctic realm and spans a number of terrestrial ecoregions.

California's large number of endemic species includes relict species, which have died out elsewhere, such as the Catalina ironwood (Lyonothamnus floribundus). Many other endemics originated through differentiation or adaptive radiation, whereby multiple species develop from a common ancestor to take advantage of diverse ecological conditions such as the California lilac (Ceanothus). Many California endemics have become endangered, as urbanization, logging, overgrazing, and the introduction of exotic species have encroached on their habitat.

Flora and fauna

California boasts several superlatives in its collection of flora: the largest trees, the tallest trees, and the oldest trees. California's native grasses are perennial plants, and there are close to hundred succulent species native to the state. After European contact, these were generally replaced by invasive species of European annual grasses; and, in modern times, California's hills turn a characteristic golden-brown in summer.

Because California has the greatest diversity of climate and terrain, the state has six life zones which are the lower Sonoran Desert; upper Sonoran (foothill regions and some coastal lands), transition (coastal areas and moist northeastern counties); and the Canadian, Hudsonian, and Arctic Zones, comprising the state's highest elevations.

Plant life in the dry climate of the lower Sonoran zone contains a diversity of native cactus, mesquite, and paloverde. The Joshua tree is found in the Mojave Desert. Flowering plants include the dwarf desert poppy and a variety of asters. Fremont cottonwood and valley oak thrive in the Central Valley. The upper Sonoran zone includes the chaparral belt, characterized by forests of small shrubs, stunted trees, and herbaceous plants. Nemophila, mint, Phacelia, Viola, and the California poppy (Eschscholzia californica, the state flower) also flourish in this zone, along with the lupine, more species of which occur here than anywhere else in the world.

The transition zone includes most of California's forests with the redwood (Sequoia sempervirens) and the "big tree" or giant sequoia (Sequoiadendron giganteum), among the oldest living things on earth (some are said to have lived at least 4,000 years). Tanbark oak, California laurel, sugar pine, madrona, broad-leaved maple, and Douglas-fir also grow here. Forest floors are covered with swordfern, alumnroot, barrenwort, and trillium, and there are thickets of huckleberry, azalea, elder, and wild currant. Characteristic wild flowers include varieties of mariposa, tulip, and tiger and leopard lilies.

The high elevations of the Canadian zone allow the Jeffrey pine, red fir, and lodgepole pine to thrive. Brushy areas are abundant with dwarf manzanita and ceanothus; the unique Sierra puffball is also found here. Right below the timberline, in the Hudsonian zone, the whitebark, foxtail, and silver pines grow.

Common plants that have been introduced to the state include the eucalyptus, acacia, pepper tree, geranium, and Scotch broom. The species that are federally classified as endangered are the Contra Costa wallflower, Antioch Dunes evening primrose, Solano grass, San Clemente Island larkspur, salt marsh bird's beak, McDonald's rock-cress, and Santa Barbara Island liveforever. , 85 plant species were listed as threatened or endangered.

In the deserts of the lower Sonoran zone, the mammals include the jackrabbit, kangaroo rat, squirrel, and opossum. Common birds include the owl, roadrunner, cactus wren, and various species of hawk. The area's reptilian life include the sidewinder viper, desert tortoise, and horned toad. The upper Sonoran zone boasts mammals such as the antelope, brown-footed woodrat, and ring-tailed cat. Birds unique to this zone are the California thrasher, bushtit, and California condor.

In the transition zone, there are Colombian black-tailed deer, black bears, gray foxes, cougars, bobcats, and Roosevelt elk. Reptiles such as the garter snakes and rattlesnakes inhabit the zone. In addition, amphibians such as the water puppy and redwood salamander are common too. Birds such as the kingfisher, chickadee, towhee, and hummingbird thrive here as well.

The Canadian zone mammals include the mountain weasel, snowshoe hare, and several species of chipmunks. Conspicuous birds include the blue-fronted jay, mountain chickadee, hermit thrush, American dipper, and Townsend's solitaire. As one ascends into the Hudsonian zone, birds become scarcer. While the gray-crowned rosy finch is the only bird native to the high Arctic region, other bird species such as Anna's hummingbird and Clark's nutcracker. Principal mammals found in this region include the Sierra coney, white-tailed jackrabbit, and the bighorn sheep. , the bighorn sheep was listed as endangered by the U.S. Fish and Wildlife Service. The fauna found throughout several zones are the mule deer, coyote, mountain lion, northern flicker, and several species of hawk and sparrow.

Aquatic life in California thrives, from the state's mountain lakes and streams to the rocky Pacific coastline. Numerous trout species are found, among them rainbow, golden, and cutthroat. Migratory species of salmon are common as well. Deep-sea life forms include sea bass, yellowfin tuna, barracuda, and several types of whale. Native to the cliffs of northern California are seals, sea lions, and many types of shorebirds, including migratory species.

, 118 California animals were on the federal endangered list; 181 plants were listed as endangered or threatened. Endangered animals include the San Joaquin kitfox, Point Arena mountain beaver, Pacific pocket mouse, salt marsh harvest mouse, Morro Bay kangaroo rat (and five other species of kangaroo rat), Amargosa vole, California least tern, California condor, loggerhead shrike, San Clemente sage sparrow, San Francisco garter snake, five species of salamander, three species of chub, and two species of pupfish. Eleven butterflies are also endangered and two that are threatened are on the federal list. Among threatened animals are the coastal California gnatcatcher, Paiute cutthroat trout, southern sea otter, and northern spotted owl. , 123 California animals were listed as either endangered or threatened on the federal list. Also, 178 species of California plants were listed either as endangered or threatened on this federal list.

Rivers

The most prominent river system within California is formed by the Sacramento River and San Joaquin River, which are fed mostly by snowmelt from the west slope of the Sierra Nevada, and respectively drain the north and south halves of the Central Valley. The two rivers join in the Sacramento–San Joaquin River Delta, flowing into the Pacific Ocean through San Francisco Bay. Many major tributaries feed into the Sacramento–San Joaquin system, including the Pit River, Feather River and Tuolumne River.

The Klamath and Trinity Rivers drain a large area in far northwestern California. The Eel River and Salinas River each drain portions of the California coast, north and south of San Francisco Bay, respectively. The Mojave River is the primary watercourse in the Mojave Desert, and the Santa Ana River drains much of the Transverse Ranges as it bisects Southern California. The Colorado River forms the state's southeast border with Arizona.

Most of California's major rivers are dammed as part of two massive water projects: the Central Valley Project, providing water for agriculture in the Central Valley, and the California State Water Project diverting water from Northern to Southern California. The state's coasts, rivers, and other bodies of water are regulated by the California Coastal Commission.

Regions

California is traditionally separated into Northern California and Southern California, divided by a straight border which runs across the state, separating the northern 48 counties from the southern 10 counties. Despite the persistence of the northern-southern divide, California is more precisely divided into many regions, multiple of which stretch across the northern-southern divide.

 Major divisions
 Northern California
 Southern California

 Regions

Cities and towns 

The state has 482 incorporated cities and towns, of which 460 are cities and 22 are towns. Under California law, the terms "city" and "town" are explicitly interchangeable; the name of an incorporated municipality in the state can either be "City of (Name)" or "Town of (Name)".

Sacramento became California's first incorporated city on February 27, 1850. San Jose, San Diego, and Benicia tied for California's second incorporated city, each receiving incorporation on March 27, 1850. Jurupa Valley became the state's most recent and 482nd incorporated municipality, on July 1, 2011.

The majority of these cities and towns are within one of five metropolitan areas: the Los Angeles Metropolitan Area, the San Francisco Bay Area, the Riverside-San Bernardino Area, the San Diego metropolitan area, or the Sacramento metropolitan area.

Demographics

Population

One out of every eight Americans live in California. The United States Census Bureau reported that the population of California was 39,538,223 on April 1, 2020, a 6.13% increase since the 2010 United States census. The estimated population as of 2022 is 39.22 million. For over a century (1900–2020), California experienced an explosion in population growth, adding an average of more than 300,000 people per year. California's rate of growth began to slow by the 1990s, although it continued to experience population growth in the first two decades of the 21st century. The state experienced population declines in 2020 and 2021, attributable to declining birth rates, COVID-19 pandemic deaths, and less internal migration from other states to California.

The Greater Los Angeles Area is the 2nd-largest metropolitan area in the United States, after the New York metropolitan area, while Los Angeles, with nearly half the population of New York City, is the second-largest city in the United States. Conversely, San Francisco, with nearly one-quarter the population density of Manhattan, is the most densely populated city in California and one of the most densely populated cities in the United States. Also, Los Angeles County has held the title of most populous United States county for decades, and it alone is more populous than 42 U.S. states. Including Los Angeles, four of the top 20 most populous cities in the U.S. are in California: Los Angeles (2nd), San Diego (8th), San Jose (10th), and San Francisco (17th). The center of population of California is located four miles west-southwest of the city of Shafter, Kern County.

As of 2019, California ranked second among states by life expectancy (after Hawaii), with a life expectancy of 80.9 years.

Starting in the year 2010, for the first time since the California Gold Rush, California-born residents make up the majority of the state's population. Along with the rest of the United States, California's immigration pattern has also shifted over the course of the late 2000s to early 2010s. Immigration from Latin American countries has dropped significantly with most immigrants now coming from Asia. In total for 2011, there were 277,304 immigrants. Fifty-seven percent came from Asian countries versus 22% from Latin American countries. Net immigration from Mexico, previously the most common country of origin for new immigrants, has dropped to zero / less than zero since more Mexican nationals are departing for their home country than immigrating.

The state's population of undocumented immigrants has been shrinking in recent years, due to increased enforcement and decreased job opportunities for lower-skilled workers. The number of migrants arrested attempting to cross the Mexican border in the Southwest decreased from a high of 1.1million in 2005 to 367,000 in 2011. Despite these recent trends, illegal aliens constituted an estimated 7.3 percent of the state's population, the third highest percentage of any state in the country, totaling nearly 2.6million. In particular, illegal immigrants tended to be concentrated in Los Angeles, Monterey, San Benito, Imperial, and Napa Counties—the latter four of which have significant agricultural industries that depend on manual labor. More than half of illegal immigrants originate from Mexico. The state of California and some California cities, including Los Angeles, Oakland and San Francisco, have adopted sanctuary policies.

According to HUD's 2022 Annual Homeless Assessment Report, there were an estimated 171,521 homeless people in California.

Race and ethnicity

According to the United States Census Bureau in 2018 the population self-identified as (alone or in combination): 72.1% White (including Hispanic Whites), 36.8% non-Hispanic whites, 15.3% Asian, 6.5% Black or African American, 1.6% Native American and Alaska Native, 0.5% Native Hawaiian or Pacific Islander, and 3.9% two or more races.

By ethnicity, in 2018 the population was 60.7% non-Hispanic (of any race) and 39.3% Hispanic or Latino (of any race). Hispanics are the largest single ethnic group in California. Non-Hispanic whites constituted 36.8% of the state's population. Californios are the Hispanic residents native to California, who make up the Spanish-speaking community that has existed in California since 1542, of varying Mexican American/Chicano, Criollo Spaniard, and Mestizo origin.

, 75.1% of California's population younger than age 1 were minorities, meaning they had at least one parent who was not non-Hispanic white (white Hispanics are counted as minorities).

In terms of total numbers, California has the largest population of White Americans in the United States, an estimated 22,200,000 residents. The state has the 5th largest population of African Americans in the United States, an estimated 2,250,000 residents. California's Asian American population is estimated at 4.4million, constituting a third of the nation's total. California's Native American population of 285,000 is the most of any state.

According to estimates from 2011, California has the largest minority population in the United States by numbers, making up 60% of the state population. Over the past 25 years, the population of non-Hispanic whites has declined, while Hispanic and Asian populations have grown. Between 1970 and 2011, non-Hispanic whites declined from 80% of the state's population to 40%, while Hispanics grew from 32% in 2000 to 38% in 2011. It is currently projected that Hispanics will rise to 49% of the population by 2060, primarily due to domestic births rather than immigration. With the decline of immigration from Latin America, Asian Americans now constitute the fastest growing racial/ethnic group in California; this growth is primarily driven by immigration from China, India and the Philippines, respectively.

Languages

English serves as California's de jure and de facto official language. In 2010, the Modern Language Association of America estimated that 57.02% (19,429,309) of California residents age5 and older spoke only English at home, while 42.98% spoke another language at home. According to the 2007 American Community Survey, 73% of people who speak a language other than English at home are able to speak English "well" or "very well," while 9.8% of them could not speak English at all. Like most U.S. states (32 out of 50), California law enshrines English as its official language, and has done so since the passage of Proposition 63 by California voters in 1986. Various government agencies do, and are often required to, furnish documents in the various languages needed to reach their intended audiences.

In total, 16 languages other than English were spoken as primary languages at home by more than 100,000 persons, more than any other state in the nation. New York State, in second place, had nine languages other than English spoken by more than 100,000 persons. The most common language spoken besides English was Spanish, spoken by 28.46% (9,696,638) of the population. With Asia contributing most of California's new immigrants, California had the highest concentration nationwide of Vietnamese and Chinese speakers, the second highest concentration of Korean, and the third highest concentration of Tagalog speakers.

California has historically been one of the most linguistically diverse areas in the world, with more than 70 indigenous languages derived from 64 root languages in six language families. A survey conducted between 2007 and 2009 identified 23 different indigenous languages among California farmworkers. All of California's indigenous languages are endangered, although there are now efforts toward language revitalization.

As a result of the state's increasing diversity and migration from other areas across the country and around the globe, linguists began noticing a noteworthy set of emerging characteristics of spoken American English in California since the late 20th century. This variety, known as California English, has a vowel shift and several other phonological processes that are different from varieties of American English used in other regions of the United States.

Religion 

The largest religious denominations by number of adherents as a percentage of California's population in 2014 were the Catholic Church with 28 percent, Evangelical Protestants with 20 percent, and Mainline Protestants with 10 percent. Together, all kinds of Protestants accounted for 32 percent. Those unaffiliated with any religion represented 27 percent of the population. The breakdown of other religions is 1% Muslim, 2% Hindu and 2% Buddhist. This is a change from 2008, when the population identified their religion with the Catholic Church with 31 percent; Evangelical Protestants with 18 percent; and Mainline Protestants with 14 percent. In 2008, those unaffiliated with any religion represented 21 percent of the population. The breakdown of other religions in 2008 was 0.5% Muslim, 1% Hindu and 2% Buddhist. The American Jewish Year Book placed the total Jewish population of California at about 1,194,190 in 2006. According to the Association of Religion Data Archives (ARDA) the largest denominations by adherents in 2010 were the Catholic Church with 10,233,334; The Church of Jesus Christ of Latter-day Saints with 763,818; and the Southern Baptist Convention with 489,953.

The first priests to come to California were Catholic missionaries from Spain. Catholics founded 21 missions along the California coast, as well as the cities of Los Angeles and San Francisco. California continues to have a large Catholic population due to the large numbers of Mexicans and Central Americans living within its borders. California has twelve dioceses and two archdioceses, the Archdiocese of Los Angeles and the Archdiocese of San Francisco, the former being the largest archdiocese in the United States.

A Pew Research Center survey revealed that California is somewhat less religious than the rest of the states: 62 percent of Californians say they are "absolutely certain" of their belief in God, while in the nation 71 percent say so. The survey also revealed 48 percent of Californians say religion is "very important", compared to 56 percent nationally.

Culture

The culture of California is a Western culture and most clearly has its modern roots in the culture of the United States, but also, historically, many Hispanic Californio and Mexican influences. As a border and coastal state, Californian culture has been greatly influenced by several large immigrant populations, especially those from Latin America and Asia.

California has long been a subject of interest in the public mind and has often been promoted by its boosters as a kind of paradise. In the early 20th century, fueled by the efforts of state and local boosters, many Americans saw the Golden State as an ideal resort destination, sunny and dry all year round with easy access to the ocean and mountains. In the 1960s, popular music groups such as The Beach Boys promoted the image of Californians as laid-back, tanned beach-goers.

The California Gold Rush of the 1850s is still seen as a symbol of California's economic style, which tends to generate technology, social, entertainment, and economic fads and booms and related busts.

Media and entertainment

Hollywood and the rest of the Los Angeles area is a major global center for entertainment, with the U.S. film industry's "Big Five" major film studios (Columbia, Disney, Paramount, Universal, and Warner Bros.) as well as many minor film studios being based in or around the area. Many animation studios are also headquartered in the state.

The five major American television broadcast networks (ABC, CBS, NBC, PBS, and Fox) as well as many other networks all have production facilities and offices in the state. All five, plus the two major Spanish-language networks (Telemundo and Univision) each have at least four owned-and-operated TV stations in California, one in Los Angeles, one in San Diego, one in San Francisco, and one in Sacramento.

The San Francisco Bay Area is home to several prominent internet media and social media companies, including three of the "Big Five" technology companies (Apple, Meta, and Google) as well as other services such as Netflix, Pandora Radio, Twitter, Yahoo!, and YouTube. Microsoft and Amazon also have offices in the area. It is also home to Silicon Valley, were many technology companies, such as HP inc., Intel, and many others are headquartered. Many automobile companies, such as Tesla, Inc., have there origins in the state, while others, like Honda, Hyundai, Toyota, Ford, Chevrolet, Jeep, Dodge, Kia, Nissan, Subaru, Volkswagen, BMW, Audi, Mercedes-Benz, Porsche, Volvo, Ferrari, Lamborghini, and many others have factories and offices in the state.

One of the oldest radio stations in the United States still in existence, KCBS (AM) in the Bay Area, was founded in 1909. Universal Music Group, one of the "Big Four" record labels, is based in Santa Monica, while Warner Records is based in Los Angeles. Many independent record labels, such as Mind of a Genius Records, are also headquartered in the state. California is also the birthplace of several international music genres, including the Bakersfield sound, Bay Area thrash metal, alternative rock, g-funk, nu metal, glam metal, thrash metal, psychedelic rock, stoner rock, punk rock, hardcore punk, metalcore, pop punk, surf music, third wave ska, west coast hip hop, west coast jazz, jazz rap, and many other genres. Other genres such as pop rock, indie rock, hard rock, hip hop, pop, rock, rockabilly, country, heavy metal, grunge, new wave and disco were popularized in the state.

Many British bands, such as Led Zeppelin, Deep Purple, Black Sabbath, and The Rolling Stones settled in the state after becoming internationally famous.

The state is home to many amusement parks, including Disneyland, Six Flags Magic Mountain, Knotts Berry Farm, Universal Studios Hollywood, Six Flags Discovery Kingdom, Knotts Soak City, Six Flags Hurricane Harbor, Disney California Adventure, California's Great America, Santa Cruz Beach Boardwalk, Pacific Park, Balboa Fun Zone, Castle Park, Belmont Park, SeaWorld, Legoland, Wet'n'Wild, and many others. The state also hosts the Orange County Fair every summer.

Sports

California has nineteen major professional sports league franchises, far more than any other state. The San Francisco Bay Area has six major league teams spread in its three major cities: San Francisco, San Jose, and Oakland, while the Greater Los Angeles Area is home to ten major league franchises. San Diego and Sacramento each have one major league team. The NFL Super Bowl has been hosted in California 12 times at five different stadiums: Los Angeles Memorial Coliseum, the Rose Bowl, Stanford Stadium, Levi's Stadium, and San Diego's Qualcomm Stadium. A thirteenth, Super Bowl LVI, was held at Sofi Stadium in Inglewood on February 13, 2022.

California has long had many respected collegiate sports programs. California is home to the oldest college bowl game, the annual Rose Bowl, among others.

The NFL has three teams in the state: The Los Angeles Rams, The Los Angeles Chargers, and the San Francisco 49ers,

The MLB has five teams in the state: The San Francisco Giants, The Oakland Athletics, The Los Angeles Dodgers, The Los Angeles Angels, and The San Diego Padres.

The NBA has four teams in the state: The Golden State Warriors,
The Los Angeles Clippers, The Los Angeles Lakers, and The Sacramento Kings. Additionally, The WNBA also has a team in the state: The Los Angeles Sparks.

The NHL has three teams in the state: The Anaheim Ducks, The Los Angeles Kings, and The San Jose Sharks.

The MLS has three teams in the state: The Los Angeles Galaxy, The San Jose Earthquakes, and The Los Angeles Football Club.

The MLR has one team in the state: The San Diego Legion.

California is the only U.S. state to have hosted both the Summer and Winter Olympics. The 1932 and 1984 summer games were held in Los Angeles. Squaw Valley Ski Resort in the Lake Tahoe region hosted the 1960 Winter Olympics. Los Angeles will host the 2028 Summer Olympics, marking the fourth time that California will have hosted the Olympic Games. Multiple games during the 1994 FIFA World Cup took place in California, with the Rose Bowl hosting eight matches (including the final), while Stanford Stadium hosted six matches.

In addition to the Olympic games, California also hosts the California State Games.

Many sports, such as Surfing, Snowboarding, and Skateboarding, were invented in California, while others like Volleyball, Beach Soccer, and Skiing were popularized in the state.

Other sports that are big in the state include Golf, Rodeo, Tennis, Mountain climbing, Marathon running, Horse racing, Bowling, Mixed Martial Arts, Boxing, and Motorsports, especially Nascar and Formula One.

Education

California has the most school students in the country, with over 6.2 million in the 2005–06 school year, giving California more students in school than 36 states have in total population and one of the highest projected enrollments in the country.Public secondary education consists of high schools that teach elective courses in trades, languages, and liberal arts with tracks for gifted, college-bound and industrial arts students. California's public educational system is supported by a unique constitutional amendment that requires a minimum annual funding level for grades K–12 and community colleges that grows with the economy and student enrollment figures.

In 2016, California's K–12 public school per-pupil spending was ranked 22nd in the nation ($11,500 per student vs. $11,800 for the U.S. average).

For 2012, California's K–12 public schools ranked 48th in the number of employees per student, at 0.102 (the U.S. average was 0.137), while paying the 7th most per employee, $49,000 (the U.S. average was $39,000).

A 2007 study concluded that California's public school system was "broken" in that it suffered from overregulation.

Higher education

California public postsecondary education is organized into three separate systems:
 The state's public research university system is the University of California (UC). As of fall 2011, the University of California had a combined student body of 234,464 students. There are ten UC campuses.  Nine are general campuses offering both undergraduate and graduate programs which culminate in the award of bachelor's degrees, master's degrees, and doctorates. There is one specialized campus, UC San Francisco, which is entirely dedicated to graduate education in health care, and is home to the UCSF Medical Center, the highest ranked hospital in California. The system was originally intended to accept the top one-eighth of California high school students, but several of the campuses have become even more selective. The UC system historically held exclusive authority to award the doctorate, but this has since changed and CSU now has limited statutory authorization to award a handful of types of doctoral degrees independently of UC.
 The California State University (CSU) system has almost 430,000 students. The CSU (which takes the definite article in its abbreviated form, while UC does not) was originally intended to accept the top one-third of California high school students, but several of the campuses have become much more selective. The CSU was originally authorized to award only bachelor's and master's degrees, and could award the doctorate only as part of joint programs with UC or private universities. Since then, CSU has been granted the authority to independently award several doctoral degrees (in specific academic fields that do not intrude upon UC's traditional jurisdiction).
 The California Community Colleges system provides lower-division coursework culminating in the associate degree, as well as basic skills and workforce training culminating in various kinds of certificates. (Fifteen California community colleges now award four-year bachelor's degrees in disciplines which are in high demand in their geographical area.) It is the largest network of higher education in the U.S., composed of 112 colleges serving a student population of over 2.6million.

California is also home to such notable private universities as Stanford University, the California Institute of Technology (Caltech), the University of Southern California, the Claremont Colleges, Santa Clara University, Loyola Marymount University, the University of San Diego, the University of San Francisco, Chapman University, Pepperdine University, Occidental College, and University of the Pacific, among numerous other private colleges and universities, including many religious and special-purpose institutions. California has a particularly high density of arts colleges, including the California College of the Arts, California Institute of the Arts, San Francisco Art Institute, Art Center College of Design, and Academy of Art University, among others. California is also home to many different trade schools, such as the Paul Mitchell school, CET San Jose, the Cinta Aveda Institute, the ZHMS Academy, Toni & Guy Hairdressing Academy, and many more.

Economy

California's economy ranks among the largest in the world. , the gross state product (GSP) was $3.6trillion ($93,130 per capita), the largest in the United States. California is responsible for one seventh of the nation's gross domestic product (GDP). , California's nominal GDP is larger than all but four countries (the United States, China, Japan, and Germany). In terms of purchasing power parity (PPP), it is larger than all but eight countries (the United States, China, India, Japan, Germany, Russia, Brazil, and Indonesia). California's economy is larger than Africa and Australia and is almost as large as South America. The state recorded total, non-farm employment of 16,677,800  among 966,224 employer establishments.

The five largest sectors of employment in California are trade, transportation, and utilities; government; professional and business services; education and health services; and leisure and hospitality. In output, the five largest sectors are financial services, followed by trade, transportation, and utilities; education and health services; government; and manufacturing. California has an unemployment rate of 3.9% .

California's economy is dependent on trade and international related commerce accounts for about one-quarter of the state's economy. In 2008, California exported $144billion worth of goods, up from $134billion in 2007 and $127billion in 2006.
Computers and electronic products are California's top export, accounting for 42 percent of all the state's exports in 2008.

Agriculture is an important sector in California's economy. Farming-related sales more than quadrupled over the past three decades, from $7.3billion in 1974 to nearly $31billion in 2004. This increase has occurred despite a 15 percent decline in acreage devoted to farming during the period, and water supply suffering from chronic instability. Factors contributing to the growth in sales-per-acre include more intensive use of active farmlands and technological improvements in crop production. In 2008, California's 81,500 farms and ranches generated $36.2billion products revenue. In 2011, that number grew to $43.5billion products revenue. The Agriculture sector accounts for two percent of the state's GDP and employs around three percent of its total workforce. According to the USDA in 2011, the three largest California agricultural products by value were milk and cream, shelled almonds, and grapes.

Per capita GDP in 2007 was $38,956, ranking eleventh in the nation. Per capita income varies widely by geographic region and profession. The Central Valley is the most impoverished, with migrant farm workers making less than minimum wage. According to a 2005 report by the Congressional Research Service, the San Joaquin Valley was characterized as one of the most economically depressed regions in the United States, on par with the region of Appalachia. Using the supplemental poverty measure, California has a poverty rate of 23.5%, the highest of any state in the country. However, using the official measure the poverty rate was only 13.3% as of 2017. Many coastal cities include some of the wealthiest per-capita areas in the United States. The high-technology sectors in Northern California, specifically Silicon Valley, in Santa Clara and San Mateo counties, have emerged from the economic downturn caused by the dot-com bust.

In 2019, there were 1,042,027 millionaire households in the state, more than any other state in the nation. In 2010, California residents were ranked first among the states with the best average credit score of 754.

State finances

State spending increased from $56billion in 1998 to $127billion in 2011. California has the third highest per capita spending on welfare among the states, as well as the highest spending on welfare at $6.67billion. In January 2011, California's total debt was at least $265billion. On June 27, 2013, Governor Jerry Brown signed a balanced budget (no deficit) for the state, its first in decades; however, the state's debt remains at $132billion.

With the passage of Proposition 30 in 2012 and Proposition 55 in 2016, California now levies a 13.3% maximum marginal income tax rate with ten tax brackets, ranging from 1% at the bottom tax bracket of $0 annual individual income to 13.3% for annual individual income over $1,000,000 (though the top brackets are only temporary until Proposition 55 expires at the end of 2030). While Proposition 30 also enacted a minimum state sales tax of 7.5%, this sales tax increase was not extended by Proposition 55 and reverted to a previous minimum state sales tax rate of 7.25% in 2017. Local governments can and do levy additional sales taxes in addition to this minimum rate.

All real property is taxable annually; the ad valorem tax is based on the property's fair market value at the time of purchase or the value of new construction. Property tax increases are capped at 2% annually or the rate of inflation (whichever is lower), per Proposition 13.

Infrastructure

Energy

Because it is the most populous state in the United States, California is one of the country's largest users of energy. However, because of its high energy rates, conservation mandates, mild weather in the largest population centers and strong environmental movement, its per capita energy use is one of the smallest of any state in the United States. Due to the high electricity demand, California imports more electricity than any other state, primarily hydroelectric power from states in the Pacific Northwest (via Path 15 and Path 66) and coal- and natural gas-fired production from the desert Southwest via Path 46.

The state's crude oil and natural gas deposits are located in the Central Valley and along the coast, including the large Midway-Sunset Oil Field. Natural gas-fired power plants typically account for more than one-half of state electricity generation.

As a result of the state's strong environmental movement, California has some of the most aggressive renewable energy goals in the United States, with a target for California to obtain a third of its electricity from renewables by 2020. Currently, several solar power plants such as the Solar Energy Generating Systems facility are located in the Mojave Desert. California's wind farms include Altamont Pass, San Gorgonio Pass, and Tehachapi Pass. The Tehachapi area is also where the Tehachapi Energy Storage Project is located. Several dams across the state provide hydro-electric power. It would be possible to convert the total supply to 100% renewable energy, including heating, cooling and mobility, by 2050.

California is also home to two major nuclear power plants: Diablo Canyon and San Onofre, the latter having been shut down in 2013. More than 1,700tons of radioactive waste are stored at San Onofre, which sits in an area where there is a record of past tsunamis. Voters banned the approval of new nuclear power plants since the late 1970s because of concerns over radioactive waste disposal. In addition, several cities such as Oakland, Berkeley and Davis have declared themselves as nuclear-free zones.

Transportation

California's vast terrain is connected by an extensive system of controlled-access highways ('freeways'), limited-access roads ('expressways'), and highways. California is known for its car culture, giving California's cities a reputation for severe traffic congestion. Construction and maintenance of state roads and statewide transportation planning are primarily the responsibility of the California Department of Transportation, nicknamed "Caltrans". The rapidly growing population of the state is straining all of its transportation networks, and California has some of the worst roads in the United States. The Reason Foundation's 19th Annual Report on the Performance of State Highway Systems ranked California's highways the third-worst of any state, with Alaska second, and Rhode Island first.
 
The state has been a pioneer in road construction. With its orange paint and panoramic views of the bay, this highway bridge is a popular tourist attraction and also accommodates pedestrians and bicyclists. The San Francisco–Oakland Bay Bridge (often abbreviated the "Bay Bridge"), completed in 1936, transports about 280,000 vehicles per day on two-decks. The Arroyo Seco Parkway, connecting Los Angeles and Pasadena, opened in 1940 as the first freeway in the Western United States. It was later extended south to the Four Level Interchange in downtown Los Angeles, regarded as the first stack interchange ever built.

Los Angeles International Airport (LAX), the 4th busiest airport in the world in 2018, and San Francisco International Airport (SFO), the 25th busiest airport in the world in 2018, are major hubs for trans-Pacific and transcontinental traffic. There are about a dozen important commercial airports and many more general aviation airports throughout the state.

California also has several major seaports. The Port of Los Angeles and the Port of Long Beach in Southern California are the largest and second-largest seaports in the U.S., respectively, by volume of container cargo handled; as of 2018, collectively they handle 31.9% of all TEUs in the United States. The Port of Oakland and Port of Hueneme are the 10th and 26th largest seaports in the U.S., respectively, by number of TEUs handled.

The California Highway Patrol is the largest statewide police agency in the United States in employment with more than 10,000 employees. They are responsible for providing any police-sanctioned service to anyone on California's state-maintained highways and on state property.

By the end of 2021, 30,610,058 people in California held a California Department of Motor Vehicles-issued driver's licenses or state identification card, and there were 36,229,205 registered vehicles, including 25,643,076 automobiles, 853,368 motorcycles, 8,981,787 trucks and trailers, and 121,716 miscellaneous vehicles (including historical vehicles and farm equipment).

Inter-city rail travel is provided by Amtrak California; the three routes, the Capitol Corridor, Pacific Surfliner, and San Joaquin, are funded by Caltrans. These services are the busiest intercity rail lines in the United States outside the Northeast Corridor and ridership is continuing to set records. The routes are becoming increasingly popular over flying, especially on the LAX-SFO route. Integrated subway and light rail networks are found in Los Angeles (Metro Rail) and San Francisco (MUNI Metro). Light rail systems are also found in San Jose (VTA), San Diego (San Diego Trolley), Sacramento (RT Light Rail), and Northern San Diego County (Sprinter). Furthermore, commuter rail networks serve the San Francisco Bay Area (ACE, BART, Caltrain, SMART), Greater Los Angeles (Metrolink), and San Diego County (Coaster).

The California High-Speed Rail Authority was created in 1996 by the state to implement an extensive  rail system. Construction was approved by the voters during the November 2008 general election, with the first phase of construction estimated to cost $64.2billion.

Nearly all counties operate bus lines, and many cities operate their own city bus lines as well. Intercity bus travel is provided by Greyhound, Megabus, and Amtrak Thruway Motorcoach.

Water

Water use and conservation in California is a politically divisive issue, as the state experiences periodic droughts and has to balance the demands of its large agricultural and urban sectors, especially in the arid southern portion of the state. The state's widespread redistribution of water also invites the frequent scorn of environmentalists.

The California Water Wars, a conflict between Los Angeles and the Owens Valley over water rights, is one of the most well-known examples of the struggle to secure adequate water supplies. Former California Governor Arnold Schwarzenegger said: "We've been in crisis for quite some time because we're now 38million people and not anymore 18million people like we were in the late 60s. So it developed into a battle between environmentalists and farmers and between the south and the north and between rural and urban. And everyone has been fighting for the last four decades about water."

Government and politics

State government

The capital city of California is Sacramento.

The state is organized into three branches of government—the executive branch consisting of the governor and the other independently elected constitutional officers; the legislative branch consisting of the Assembly and Senate; and the judicial branch consisting of the Supreme Court of California and lower courts. The state also allows ballot propositions: direct participation of the electorate by initiative, referendum, recall, and ratification. Before the passage of California Proposition 14 (2010), California allowed each political party to choose whether to have a closed primary or a primary where only party members and independents vote. After June 8, 2010, when Proposition 14 was approved, excepting only the United States president and county central committee offices, all candidates in the primary elections are listed on the ballot with their preferred party affiliation, but they are not the official nominee of that party. At the primary election, the two candidates with the top votes will advance to the general election regardless of party affiliation. If at a special primary election, one candidate receives more than 50% of all the votes cast, they are elected to fill the vacancy and no special general election will be held.

Judicial branch

California's legal system is explicitly based upon English common law but carries many features from Spanish civil law, such as community property. California's prison population grew from 25,000 in 1980 to over 170,000 in 2007. Capital punishment is a legal form of punishment and the state has the largest "Death Row" population in the country (though Oklahoma and Texas are far more active in carrying out executions). California has performed 13 executions since 1976, with the last being in 2006.

California's judiciary system is the largest in the United States with a total of 1,600 judges (the federal system has only about 840). At the apex is the seven-member Supreme Court of California, while the California Courts of Appeal serve as the primary appellate courts and the California Superior Courts serve as the primary trial courts. Justices of the Supreme Court and Courts of Appeal are appointed by the governor, but are subject to retention by the electorate every 12 years.

The administration of the state's court system is controlled by the Judicial Council, composed of the chief justice of the California Supreme Court, 14 judicial officers, four representatives from the State Bar of California, and one member from each house of the state legislature.

In fiscal year 2020–21, the state judiciary's 2,000 judicial officers and 18,000 judicial branch employees processed approximately 4.4 million cases.

Executive branch

The California executive branch consists of the governor and seven other elected constitutional officers: lieutenant governor, attorney general, secretary of state, state controller, state treasurer, insurance commissioner, and state superintendent of public instruction. They serve four-year terms and may be re-elected only once.

Legislative branch

The California State Legislature consists of a 40-member Senate and 80-member Assembly. Senators serve four-year terms and Assembly members two. Members of the Assembly are subject to term limits of six terms, and members of the Senate are subject to term limits of three terms.

Local government

California has an extensive system of local government that manages public functions throughout the state. Like most states, California is divided into counties, of which there are 58 (including San Francisco) covering the entire state. Most urbanized areas are incorporated as cities, School districts, which are independent of cities and counties, handle public education. Many other functions, especially in unincorporated areas, are handled by special districts.

Counties

California is divided into 58 counties. Per Article 11, Section 1, of the Constitution of California, they are the legal subdivisions of the state. The county government provides countywide services such as law enforcement, jails, elections and voter registration, vital records, property assessment and records, tax collection, public health, health care, social services, libraries, flood control, fire protection, animal control, agricultural regulations, building inspections, ambulance services, and education departments in charge of maintaining statewide standards. In addition, the county serves as the local government for all unincorporated areas. Each county is governed by an elected board of supervisors.

City and town governments

Incorporated cities and towns in California are either charter or general-law municipalities. General-law municipalities owe their existence to state law and are consequently governed by it; charter municipalities are governed by their own city or town charters. Municipalities incorporated in the 19th century tend to be charter municipalities. All ten of the state's most populous cities are charter cities. Most small cities have a council–manager form of government, where the elected city council appoints a city manager to supervise the operations of the city. Some larger cities have a directly elected mayor who oversees the city government. In many council-manager cities, the city council selects one of its members as a mayor, sometimes rotating through the council membership—but this type of mayoral position is primarily ceremonial. The Government of San Francisco is the only consolidated city-county in California, where both the city and county governments have been merged into one unified jurisdiction.

School districts and special districts

About 1,102 school districts, independent of cities and counties, handle California's public education. California school districts may be organized as elementary districts, high school districts, unified school districts combining elementary and high school grades, or community college districts.

There are about 3,400 special districts in California. A special district, defined by California Government Code § 16271(d) as "any agency of the state for the local performance of governmental or proprietary functions within limited boundaries", provides a limited range of services within a defined geographic area. The geographic area of a special district can spread across multiple cities or counties, or could consist of only a portion of one. Most of California's special districts are single-purpose districts, and provide one service.

Federal representation

The state of California sends 52 members to the House of Representatives, the nation's largest congressional state delegation. Consequently, California also has the largest number of electoral votes in national presidential elections, with 54. The current speaker of the House of Representatives is the representative of California's 20th district, Kevin McCarthy.

California is represented by U.S. senators Dianne Feinstein, a native and former mayor of San Francisco, and Alex Padilla, a native and former secretary of state of California. Former U.S. senator Kamala Harris, a native, former district attorney from San Francisco, former attorney general of California, resigned on January 18, 2021, to assume her role as the current Vice President of the United States. In the 1992 U.S. Senate election, California became the first state to elect a Senate delegation entirely composed of women, due to the victories of Feinstein and Barbara Boxer. Set to follow the Vice President-Elect, Gov. Newsom appointed Secretary of State Alex Padilla to finish the rest of Harris's term which ends in 2022, Padilla has vowed to run for the full term in that election cycle. Padilla was sworn in on January 20, 2021, the same day as the Inauguration of President-Elect Joe Biden as well as Harris.

Armed forces

In California, the U.S. Department of Defense had a total of 117,806 active duty servicemembers of which 88,370 were Sailors or Marines, 18,339 were Airmen, and 11,097 were Soldiers, with 61,365 Department of Defense civilian employees. Additionally, there were a total of 57,792 Reservists and Guardsman in California.

In 2010, Los Angeles County was the largest origin of military recruits in the United States by county, with 1,437 individuals enlisting in the military. However, Californians were relatively under-represented in the military as a proportion to its population.

In 2000, California, had 2,569,340 veterans of United States military service: 504,010 served in World War II, 301,034 in the Korean War, 754,682 during the Vietnam War, and 278,003 during 1990–2000 (including the Persian Gulf War). , there were 1,942,775 veterans living in California, of which 1,457,875 served during a period of armed conflict, and just over four thousand served before World WarII (the largest population of this group of any state).

California's military forces consist of the Army and Air National Guard, the naval and state military reserve (militia), and the California Cadet Corps.

On August 5, 1950, a nuclear-capable United States Air Force Boeing B-29 Superfortress bomber carrying a nuclear bomb crashed shortly after takeoff from Fairfield-Suisun Air Force Base. Brigadier General Robert F. Travis, command pilot of the bomber, was among the dead.

Ideology

California has an idiosyncratic political culture compared to the rest of the country, and is sometimes regarded as a trendsetter. In socio-cultural mores and national politics, Californians are perceived as more liberal than other Americans, especially those who live in the inland states. In the 2016 United States presidential election, California had the third highest percentage of Democratic votes behind the District of Columbia and Hawaii. In the 2020 United States presidential election, it had the 6th highest behind the District of Columbia, Vermont, Massachusetts, Maryland, and Hawaii. According to the Cook Political Report, California contains five of the 15 most Democratic congressional districts in the United States.

Among the political idiosyncrasies, California was the second state to recall their state governor (the first state being North Dakota in 1921), the second state to legalize abortion, and the only state to ban marriage for gay couples twice by vote (including Proposition8 in 2008). Voters also passed Proposition 71 in 2004 to fund stem cell research, making California the second state to legalize stem cell research after New Jersey, and Proposition 14 in 2010 to completely change the state's primary election process. California has also experienced disputes over water rights; and a tax revolt, culminating with the passage of Proposition 13 in 1978, limiting state property taxes. California voters have rejected affirmative action on multiple occasions, most recently in November 2020.

The state's trend towards the Democratic Party and away from the Republican Party can be seen in state elections. From 1899 to 1939, California had Republican governors. Since 1990, California has generally elected Democratic candidates to federal, state and local offices, including current Governor Gavin Newsom; however, the state has elected Republican Governors, though many of its Republican Governors, such as Arnold Schwarzenegger, tend to be considered moderate Republicans and more centrist than the national party.

Several political movements have advocated for Californian independence. The California National Party and the California Freedom Coalition both advocate for Californian independence along the lines of progressivism and civic nationalism. The Yes California movement attempted to organize an independence referendum via ballot initiative for 2019, which was then postponed.

The Democrats also now hold a supermajority in both houses of the state legislature. There are 62 Democrats and 18 Republicans in the Assembly; and 32 Democrats and 8 Republicans in the Senate.

The trend towards the Democratic Party is most obvious in presidential elections. From 1952 through 1988, California was a Republican leaning state, with the party carrying the state's electoral votes in nine of ten elections, with 1964 as the exception. Southern California Republicans Richard Nixon and Ronald Reagan were both elected twice as the 37th and 40th U.S. Presidents, respectively. However, Democrats have won all of California's electoral votes for the last eight elections, starting in 1992.

In the United States House, the Democrats held a 34–19 edge in the CA delegation of the 110th United States Congress in 2007. As the result of gerrymandering, the districts in California were usually dominated by one or the other party, and few districts were considered competitive. In 2008, Californians passed Proposition 20 to empower a 14-member independent citizen commission to redraw districts for both local politicians and Congress. After the 2012 elections, when the new system took effect, Democrats gained four seats and held a 38–15 majority in the delegation. Following the 2018 midterm House elections, Democrats won 46 out of 53 congressional house seats in California, leaving Republicans with seven.

In general, Democratic strength is centered in the populous coastal regions of the Los Angeles metropolitan area and the San Francisco Bay Area. Republican strength is still greatest in eastern parts of the state. Orange County had remained largely Republican until the 2016 and 2018 elections, in which a majority of the county's votes were cast for Democratic candidates. One study ranked Berkeley, Oakland, Inglewood and San Francisco in the top 20 most liberal American cities; and Bakersfield, Orange, Escondido, Garden Grove, and Simi Valley in the top 20 most conservative cities.

In October 2022, out of the 26,876,800 people eligible to vote, 21,940,274 people were registered to vote. Of the people registered, the three largest registered groups were Democrats (10,283,258), Republicans (5,232,094), and No Party Preference (4,943,696). Los Angeles County had the largest number of registered Democrats (2,996,565) and Republicans (958,851) of any county in the state.

Twinned regions 
California has region twinning arrangements with:
 Catalonia, autonomous community of  Spain
 Alberta, province of  Canada
 Jeju Province of  South Korea

See also
 Index of California-related articles
 Outline of California
 USS California, 7 ships

Notes

References

Citations

Works cited

Further reading
 
 
 
 Matthews, Glenna. The Golden State in the Civil War: Thomas Starr King, the Republican Party, and the Birth of Modern California. New York: Cambridge University Press, 2012.

External links

 State of California
 California State Guide, from the Library of Congress
 
 data.ca.gov: open data portal from California state agencies
 California State Facts from USDA
 California Drought: Farm and Food Impacts from USDA, Economic Research Service
 
 1973 documentary featuring aerial views of the California coastline from Mt. Shasta to Los Angeles
 Early City Views (Los Angeles) 

 
States and territories established in 1850
States of the United States
States of the West Coast of the United States
1850 establishments in California
Former Spanish colonies
Western United States
1850 establishments in the United States
Contiguous United States